Sidi Ali Boussidi District is a district of Sidi Bel Abbès Province, Algeria.

Climate and Geography 
Sidi Ali Boussidi District is situated at the northern part of Algeria, which allows for the district to get a much more temperate climate then the other parts of Algeria. The Köppen climate classification subtype for this climate is "Csa" (Hot-summer Mediterranean climate). The district is in a very flat plain and has a level elevation of 600 m (1,968.5 ft).

Districts of Sidi Bel Abbès Province